Michele Aboro (born 17 July 1967) is a British former professional boxer who competed from 1995 to 2001. She retired an undefeated world champion, having held the WIBF super-bantamweight title from 2000 to 2001.

Michele Aboro, along with her countrywoman Michelle Sutcliffe and German Regina Halmich, became an important figure in European women's boxing, helping raise awareness about female participation in a traditionally male sport.

Professional career
On 4 March 1995 she debuted as a professional boxer, with a first round knockout win over Marleen Lambert in Belgium. As a matter of a fact, her first three professional fights were held in different European countries (Belgium, Italy and Hungary) and they were all first-round knockout wins for Aboro. Her fourth fight, on 19 October 1996 against Severine Grandsire, was her first fight in Germany, and Aboro won by a sixth-round technical knockout.

Aboro had one more win, and then, on 29 November 1997, she met future world champion Daisy Lang, defeating Lang by a six-round decision.

On 22 August 1998 Aboro fought Brigitte Pastor for the vacant WIBF European Super Bantamweight title, knocking out Pastor in five rounds to win her first professional belt. She defended her title once, knocking out Galina Gumliiska in eight rounds on 28 November, then followed that win with four more wins in a row, before obtaining her first world title opportunity. Aboro became a world champion when she fought Eva Jones, on 5 February 2000, knocking Jones out in round ten to become the WIBF's world Super Bantamweight champion.

Then came Downtown Leona Brown's challenge. Aboro met the future world champion on 13 June that year, defeating Brown by a ten-round decision.

After two, non-title wins, she faced the highly touted contender Kelsey Jeffries, who had 10 wins and only 2 losses coming into their bout, for her second world championship defence. Aboro defended the title successfully against Jeffries on 10 February 2001, with a ten-round decision win.

After one more non-title win, Aboro made what has been, to date, her last fight. On 24 November that year she beat Nadia Debras, who she had previously beaten, by a ten-round decision, to retain her world title for the third time.

Aboro has not officially announced her retirement. However, should she decide to remain inactive and, ultimately, to retire from boxing, she would join Rocky Marciano and a handful of others in boxing's history to retire as an undefeated world champion.

As of 2019, Aboro is a resident of Amsterdam, Netherlands.

Professional boxing record

Kickboxing record

|-
|-  bgcolor="CCFFCC"
| 1995-09-10 || Win ||align=left|Miyuki Nojima || Dutch K-1 Tournament, Final || Amsterdam, Netherlands || TKO || 1 || || 
|-
|-  bgcolor="CCFFCC"
| 1995-09-10 || Win ||align=left|Fienie Klee || Dutch K-1 Tournament, Semi Final || Amsterdam, Netherlands || Points || 3 || || 
|-
|-  bgcolor="CCFFCC"
| 1995-06-11 || Win ||align=left|Stephanie Curtiss || ISKA World Championships, Finals || Moscow, Russia || Points || 3 || || 
|-
! style=background:white colspan=9 |
|-  bgcolor="CCFFCC"
| 1995-06-11 || Win ||align=left|Natasha Larionova || ISKA World Championships, Semi Finals || Moscow, Russia || Points || 3 || || 
|-
|-  bgcolor="CCFFCC"
| 1995-06-11 || Win ||align=left|Mary Shariyk || ISKA World Championships, Quarters Finals || Moscow, Russia || TKO ||  || || 
|-
|-  bgcolor="CCFFCC"
| 1995-04-02 || Win ||align=left|Severine Grandsire || || Amsterdam, Netherlands || TKO || 3 || || 
|-
|-  bgcolor="CCFFCC"
| 1994-00-00 || Win ||align=left|Fienie Klee || ||  || TKO || 5 || || 
|-
|-  bgcolor="FFBBBB"
| 1992-05-17 || Loss ||align=left|Lucia Rijker || || Hamburg, Germany || TKO || || || 
|-  bgcolor="FFBBBB"
| 1992-00-00 || Loss ||align=left|Nancy Joseph || ||  ||  ||  || || 
|-
|-  bgcolor="CCFFCC"
| 1991-09-00 || Win ||align=left| || || Paris, France || KO || 1 || || 
|-
! style=background:white colspan=9 |
|-  bgcolor="FFBBBB"
| 1991-06-09 || Loss ||align=left|Lucia Rijker || || Oldham, England || TKO || 1 || || 
|-
! style=background:white colspan=9 |
|-
|-  bgcolor="c5d2ea"
| 1991-04-21 || Draw ||align=left|Lisa Howarth || || London, England || Draw ||  || || 
|-
|-  bgcolor="CCFFCC"
| 1990-00-00 || Win ||align=left|Ann Holmes || || London, England || Points || 5 || || 
|-
! style=background:white colspan=9 |
|-
| colspan=9 | Legend:

References

External links
Official site
 
 Michele Aboro at Awakening Fighters

1969 births
Living people
English women boxers
Boxers from Greater London
English emigrants to China
English sportspeople of Nigerian descent
World boxing champions
English female kickboxers
English Muay Thai practitioners
Female Muay Thai practitioners
English female mixed martial artists
Mixed martial artists utilizing boxing
Mixed martial artists utilizing Muay Thai
Super-bantamweight boxers
English emigrants to the Netherlands
Undefeated world boxing champions